Zheleznogorsk Urban Okrug is the name of several municipal formations in Russia. The following administrative divisions are incorporated as such:
Closed Administrative-Territorial Formation of Zheleznogorsk, Krasnoyarsk Krai
Town of Oblast Significance of Zheleznogorsk, Kursk Oblast

See also
Zheleznogorsk (disambiguation)

References